Taihe is a town under the administration of Zichuan District, Zibo, Shandong, China. , it has 95 villages under its administration:
Taihe Village
Dongtonggu Village
Tongguping Village
Houyu Village
Songjia Village
Caojia Village
Guojia Village
Lijia Village
Heishan Village
Zhaojiazhuang Village
Beimalu Village
Nanmalu Village
Xitonggu Village
Yangquan Village
Linquan Village
Xin Village
Nanxiace Village
Laoyu Village
Xiaohougou Village
Beixiace Village
Wangzishan Village
Dongxiace Village
Houzhuang Village
Dongyu Village
Dongtaihe Village
Dongya Village
Nanyang Village
Dongnanmou Village
Beimou Village
Xinanmou Village
Fangshan Village
Shuangshan Village
Dongyuliang Village
Xiyuliang Village
Zihe Village
Mengquan Village
Shuangjing Village
Yangjia Village
Beiqi Village
Xingfu Village
Tingziya Village
Yongquan Village
Nangu Village
Sanghang Village
Chenjiajing Village
Chiban Village
Xigu Village
Dongpo Village
Dongdeng Village
Qianhuai Village
Dongshimen Village
Maling Village
Sunjiazhuang Village
Qianxiangyu Village
Houxiangyu Village
Xishimen Village
Beizhenhou Village
Nanzhenhou Village
Chengzi Village
Wantou Village
Beiyueyin Village
Nanyueyin Village
Jufeng Village
Xiaokoutou Village
Ezhuang Village
Shanqiao Village
Yangjiazhuang Village
Shangqueyu Village
Xiaqueyu Village
Houziyu Village
Qiangou Village
Hougou Village
Shamao Village
Wangjiazhuang Village
Luoquan Village
Qinjiazhuang Village
Xiangquan Village
Tuquan Village
Liuhua Village
Xidongyu Village
Dongdongyu Village
Shangduanshi Village
Xiaduanshi Village
Shimudi Village
Shangdaoping Village
Xiadaoping Village
Xidaoping Village
Dongpozhuang Village
Baishu Village
Sunjiaping Village
Shigou Village
Shi'anyu Village
Dongshi Village
Luziyu Village
Xishi Village

References 

Township-level divisions of Shandong
Zibo